Lashkargah is a district in the east of Helmand Province, Afghanistan, surrounding the provincial capital of Lashkargah. Its population is 45% Pashtun and 20% Baluch, with c. 30% Tajiks, 5% are Hindus and Hazara; the population was estimated at 43,934 in 2018. Hilmand is mainly a desert and dry province.

References

External links
 Map of Lashkargah district (PDF)

Districts of Helmand Province